Alfred Kinvig (16 March 1874 – 15 February 1965) was a New Zealand cricketer. He played first-class cricket for Canterbury and Otago between 1893 and 1904.

See also
 List of Otago representative cricketers

References

External links
 

1874 births
1965 deaths
New Zealand cricketers
Canterbury cricketers
Otago cricketers
Cricketers from Dunedin